The Kalinga War (ended ) was fought in ancient India between the Maurya Empire under Ashoka and the state of Kalinga, an independent feudal kingdom located on the east coast, in the present-day state of Odisha and northern parts of Andhra Pradesh. It is presumed that the battle was fought on Dhauli hills in Dhauli which is situated on the banks of Daya River. The Kalinga War was one of the largest and deadliest battles in Indian history. 

This is the only major war Ashoka fought after his accession to the throne, and marked the close of the empire-building and military conquests of ancient India that began with the Mauryan Emperor Chandragupta Maurya. The war cost nearly 250,000 lives.

Background 
According to political scientist Sudama Misra, the Kalinga janapada originally comprised the area covered by the Puri and Ganjam districts.

The reasons for invading Kalinga were to bring peace and for power. Kalinga was a prosperous region consisting of peaceful and artistically skilled people. The northern part of Kalinga was known as the Utkala (Uttar: North, Kal: Kalinga), they were the first from the region to use a navy and traveled offshore to southeast Asia for trade. For that reason, Kalinga was able to develop several ports and a skilled navy. The culture of Kalinga was a blend of forest tribal and Brahminism co-existing peacefully.

Kalinga was under the rule of the Nanda Empire who ruled over the region from their capital in Magadha until their fall in 321 BCE. Ashoka's grandfather Chandragupta Maurya had previously attempted to conquer Kalinga but had been repulsed. Ashoka set himself to the task of conquering and annexing Kalinga to the vast Maurya Empire as soon as he securely established himself as the king of Magadha. Some scholars argue that Kalinga was a strategic threat to the Mauryas. It could interrupt communications between Mauryan capital Pataliputra and possessions in the central Indian peninsula. Kalinga also controlled the coastline for trade in the Bay of Bengal.

Course of the war

The war was completed in the eighth year of Ashoka's reign, according to his own Edicts of Ashoka, probably in 261 BCE.  After a bloody battle for the throne following the death of his father, Ashoka was successful in conquering Kalinga – but the consequences of the savagery changed Ashoka's views on war and led him to pledge to never again wage a war of conquest.

According to Megasthenes, the Greek historian at the court of Chandragupta Maurya, the ruler of Kalinga had a powerful army comprising infantry, cavalry and elephants.

Aftermath

Ashoka had seen the bloodshed and felt that he was the cause of the destruction. The whole area of Kalinga was plundered and destroyed. Some of Ashoka's later edicts state that about 150,000 people died on the Kalinga side and an almost equal number of Ashoka's army, though legends among the Odia people – descendants of Kalinga's natives – claim that these figures were highly exaggerated by Ashoka. As per the legends, Kalinga armies caused twice the amount of destruction they suffered. However, prominent historians have rejected this claim and the edicts of Ashoka are believed to be the primary evidence. Thousands of men and women were deported from Kalinga and forced to work on clearing wastelands for future settlement.

Ashoka's response to the Kalinga War is recorded in the Edicts of Ashoka. The Kalinga War prompted Ashoka, already a non-engaged Buddhist, to devote the rest of his life to ahimsa (non-violence) and to dharma-Vijaya (victory through dharma). Following the conquest of Kalinga, Ashoka ended the military expansion of the empire and began an era of more than 40 years of relative peace, harmony, and prosperity.

In popular culture

 The 2001 Indian Hindi-language film Aśoka, is based on Kalinga war

See also 

 List of battles by casualties
 Kalinga (historical region)

References

External links
 Megasthenes: Indika
 The Edicts of King Ashoka

260s BC conflicts
History of Odisha
Wars involving India
Kalinga
Maurya Empire
Kalinga (India)
Wars involving ancient India
3rd century BC in India
Conflicts in India
Ashoka